The  was a Japanese aristocratic kin group. The Ichijō was a branch of the Fujiwara clan, founded by Kujō Michiie's son Ichijō Sanetsune and was one of the Five regent houses, from which the Sesshō and Kampaku were chosen.

Genealogy

Tosa-Ichijō clan
The , a cadet branch of the Ichijō family, was established during the chaos of Ōnin War. In 1475, Ichijō Norifusa, the 9th head of the family, fled from Kyoto to Tosa Province, where one of the fiefdoms the family held by the time; some descendants of Norifusa stayed in Tosa for generations. The family, however, eventually lost control of Tosa during the reign of Ichijō Kanesada since 1575.

The following is the list of the heads of the Tosa-Ichijō clan:
 Norifusa (1423-1480)
 Fusaie (1475-1539), second son of Norifusa
  (1498-1541), eldest son of Norifusa and brother of Fusamichi (11th head)
  (1522-1549), son of Fusafuyu
 Kanesada (1543-1585), son of Fusamoto
 Tadamasa (d. c. 1580), son of Kanesada
  (b. c. 1578), son of Tadamasa. His whereabouts was lost in record since 1600, after the fall of the Chōsokabe clan as a result of the Battle of Sekigahara.

In 1902, Ichijō Sanemoto (一条実基, 1901-1972), eldest son of Ichijō Saneteru (25th head of Ichijō) and his second wife, became a baron, in name of revival for the Tosa-Ichijō clan. Baron Ichijō Sanemoto later married a British woman, Tess Snare (1900-1982), in 1928.

Daigo family
The  was founded in 1679 by Ichijō Akiyoshi's second son Fuyumoto. The family name was given by Fuyumoto's cousin, Emperor Reigen.

See also
 Japanese clans
 List of Kuge families
 Five Regent Houses

References

External links
 Ichijō kamon at Harimaya.com

 
Japanese clans
Fujiwara clan